Sant Feliu de Buixalleu is a village in the province of Girona and autonomous community of Catalonia, Spain. The village is situated in the southeast of the ancient Catalan comarca of Selva.

References

External links
 Government data pages 

Municipalities in Selva